"Heartbeat" is a song recorded by Australian group Girlfriend. The song was released in September 1993 as the lead single from their second studio album It's Up to You. The song peaked at number 36 on the ARIA Charts.

Track listing

Charts

References

1993 songs
1993 singles
Bertelsmann Music Group singles
Girlfriend (band) songs
Songs written by Lori Barth